NiceHash is a global cryptocurrency hash power broker and cryptocurrency exchange with an open marketplace that connects sellers of hashing power (cryptominers) with buyers of hashing power using the sharing economy approach. The company provides software for cryptocurrency mining. The company was founded in 2014 by two Slovenian university students, Marko Kobal and Matjaž Škorjanc. 

The company is based in The British Virgin Islands and has offices in Maribor, Slovenia. NiceHash users are primarily video gamers who have powerful  graphics cards (GPUs) suited to cryptocurrency mining. The company has over 2.5 million users in 190 countries worldwide as of November 2021.

History 

NiceHash was founded in 2014, a former medical student turned computer programmer, and Marko Kobal.

NiceHash's original founder Matjaž Škorjanc was allegedly one of the creators of malware called Mariposa botnet and served four years and ten months in a Slovenian prison. On June 5, 2019, US law enforcement reopened a case in the operations of the Mariposa (Butterfly Bot, BFBOT) malware gang. In 2019, The FBI moved forward with new charges and arrest warrants against four suspects, including Matjaž Škorjanc. Matjaž was detained in prison in Germany in 2019. Due to international law agreements on double jeopardy, he was released in 2020. Matjaž provided the original concept for the company, but is not involved in its operation and the current CEO is Martin Škorjanc.

On December 6, 2017, approximately 4,700 Bitcoins (US$64 million at the time of the hack) were stolen from NiceHash allegedly by a spear phishing attack. Due to the open and transparent nature of the blockchain, the security breach received an influx of attention as the stolen sum and movement of bitcoins were visible to anyone on the internet.

On December 21, 2017, Marko Kobal resigned as the CEO of NiceHash. On that day, the company also re-opened their marketplace after the December 6th hack. NiceHash announced that they had hired cyber security and implemented new security protocols after the incident. NiceHash reimbursed affected users who made a claim by the deadline of December 16, 2020, and returned their Bitcoin funds in full.

On February 17, 2021, a North Korean hacker group (Lazarus) was indicted for the 2017 NiceHash attack.

NiceHash opened a cryptocurrency exchange in May 2019, where miners and other traders of cryptocurrencies trade their mined coins to other cryptocurrencies or exchange to fiat currency. The platform lists 64 coins and tokens, and 80 trading pairs.

In May 2022, NiceHash became the first provider of mining software to unlock Nvidia's LHR (Light Hash Rate).

Business model

Hash power marketplace 
NiceHash provides an open hash power marketplace where buyers can bid to purchase computer power to add to their mining pool or operations. In return for providing this service, NiceHash takes a percentage or fee from each group (buyers and sellers).

Sellers of hash power 
Sellers have to run NiceHash mining software and connect their mining hardware or just regular PCs or graphics cards to NiceHash stratum servers and to the buyer's order. Their hashing power is forwarded to the pool that the buyer has chosen for mining. For each valid share they submit, they get paid in bitcoin for the price that is determined by the current weighted average and refreshed each minute. This is all done automatically and the process does not require complex technical skills. The sellers are technically not 'miners' (although the computer hardware is mining) as they do not choose or control which algorithm their hardware operates on. They are renting out the hardware to be used for mining by other people (buyers) in a similar concept to cloud mining.

Buyers of hashpower (miners) 
Buyers bid on the open marketplace for hash power on different mining algorithms, and direct it to their mining pool to increase their chances of finding a block reward. Much of the process of bidding is automated by trading bots.

References

External links 

 licensed CC BY-SA

Cryptocurrencies
Slovenian websites
Internet properties established in 2014
Companies based in Ljubljana
Slovenian brands
Companies established in 2014
Cryptocurrency theft